Bhaisipankha is a former VDC and now a neighborhood of Bhojpur Municipality in Bhojpur District in the Province No. 1 of eastern Nepal. At the time of the 1991 Nepal census it had a population of 3,077 persons living in 555 individual households.

On 18 May 2014 Government of Nepal declared 72 new municipality within the whole country. Same time Bhojpur Municipality declared, incorporating Bhojpur, Bhaisipankha, Bokhim and Taksar VDCs diving in 11 ward units.

It is Ward No. 10 of Bhojpur Municipality.

References

External links
UN map of the municipalities of Bhojpur District

Populated places in Bhojpur District, Nepal
Bhojpur Municipality